The Chinese Taipei women's national ice hockey team is the ice hockey team representing Taiwan internationally in women's competition. The team is overseen by the Chinese Taipei Ice Hockey Federation, a member of the International Ice Hockey Federation. The team was formed in 2014 and competed in the IIHF Women's Challenge Cup of Asia Division I tournament, which it has won on two occasions, currently competes in IIHF Women's Ice Hockey World Championships Division 2B.

History
The Chinese Taipei women's national ice hockey team played its first game in November 2014 at the 2015 IIHF Women's Challenge Cup of Asia Division I tournament. Chinese Taipei won their opening game of the tournament against Hong Kong and went on to win their three other games which included a second win against Hong Kong and two wins against Thailand. Chinese Taipei finished the tournament at the top of the standings and won the gold medal. The team returned to competition in March 2016 for the 2016 IIHF Women's Challenge Cup of Asia Division I tournament. The tournament had expanded to five teams and included India, Malaysia, Singapore and Thailand. Chinese Taipei finished at the top of the standings after winning all four of their games and claimed their second tournament title. The tournament also included the team's 21–0 defeat of Malaysia, their largest win in internal competition.

International competitions

World Championship
2017 – Finished in 33rd place (1st in Division IIB Qualification, Promoted to Division IIB)
2018 – Finished in 29th place (2nd in Division IIB)
2019 – Finished in 29th place (1st in Division IIB, Promoted to Division IIA)
2020 – Cancelled due to the COVID-19 pandemic
2021 – Cancelled due to the COVID-19 pandemic
2022 – Finished in 25th place (4th in Division IIA)

Women's Challenge Cup of Asia
2015 Division I – 1st
2016 Division I – 1st
2019 Top Division – 2nd

Team roster
For the 2016 IIHF Women's Challenge Cup of Asia Division I

All-time record against other nations
Last match update: 18 March 2022

References

External links
 
IIHF profile

Ice hockey in Taiwan
Ice hockey
Women's national ice hockey teams in Asia